Valentin Pshenitsyn (3 November 1936 – 2007) was a Soviet biathlete. He competed in the 20 km individual event at the 1960 Winter Olympics and the 1964 Winter Olympics.

References

External links
 

1936 births
2007 deaths
Soviet male biathletes
Olympic biathletes of the Soviet Union
Biathletes at the 1960 Winter Olympics
Biathletes at the 1964 Winter Olympics
Skiers from Moscow